Lake Jaala is a lake of Estonia.

See also
List of lakes of Estonia

Jaala
Alutaguse Parish
Jaala